Yukhari Askipara is a destroyed Azerbaijani village in an exclave of the Qazakh District of Azerbaijan, currently under control by Armenia and surrounded by the Tavush Province of Armenia. The exclave has been under control by Armenian forces since the First Nagorno-Karabakh War which also included fighting in Qazakh. Today, the village is destroyed, with only the foundations and some lower portions of the houses remaining.

History 
There are three medieval bridges, a fortress and the ruins of a church in the village.

According to the 1915 publication of the Caucasian Calendar, Yukhari Askipara (Аксибара Стар., Aksibara Star.) had a predominantly Tatar (later known as Azerbaijani) population of 278 in 1914.

The village was captured by Armenians in 1990 and its Azerbaijani inhabitants (some 500 people comprising around 100 families) were expelled, becoming internally displaced persons in other villages of Azerbaijan's Qazax district. The village is now administered as part of Tavush Province of Armenia.

Notable people
Locally born Firudin Musayev rose from a peasant background to become a brigadier, then state farm director before becoming a deputy of the 8th convocation of the Supreme Soviet of the Soviet Union.

References

External links 

Enclaves and exclaves
Populated places in Qazax District
Former populated places in the Caucasus